The FIS Nordic World Ski Championships 2011 took place from 23 February to 6 March 2011 in Oslo, Norway. The championships consisted of 21 events in cross-country skiing, ski jumping, and Nordic combined, of which eight were team or relay events. The tournament was held at Holmenkollen National Arena, with ski jumping in the large Holmenkollbakken and the normal Midtstubakken, and coincided with the Holmenkollen Ski Festival. Since the 2009 World Championships, a normal hill team event was added for both ski jumping and Nordic combined, while the combined mass start was removed from the program.

Norway was the most successful nation, collecting eight gold medals and twenty medals overall. Austria was the second-most successful, collecting seven golds and ten golds overall. Austria won all ski jumping competitions, as well as both combined team events. Norway dominated the cross-country events, winning both relays and taking 12 of the 24 individual medals. Norway's Marit Bjørgen was the most successful athlete, winning four gold and one silver medal. Petter Northug, also from Norway, won three gold and two silver medals. Canada, with Devon Kershaw and Alex Harvey took its first-ever victory with gold in the men's team sprint. Sweden's Marcus Hellner won the men's sprint, while Finland's Matti Heikkinen won the men's 15 km. Sweden, with Ida Ingemarsdotter and Charlotte Kalla, won the Women's team sprint.

In ski jumping, the Austrians Thomas Morgenstern took three golds and one silver, Gregor Schlierenzauer won three golds, and Daniela Iraschko won the women's event. In the Nordic combined, Germany took four of the six individual medals. The normal hill was won by Germany's Eric Frenzel while France' Jason Lamy-Chappuis won the large hill.

Events

Cross-country skiing

Men's

Women's

Nordic combined

Ski jumping

Men's

Women's

Medal table

Nations

Athletes

FIS Nordic World Ski Championships 2011